Paul Papalia CSC (born 12 July 1962) is an Australian politician. He has been a Labor Party member of the Western Australian Legislative Assembly since February 2007. Originally the member for Peel. He is now the member for Warnbro. A decorated former navy diver who served two tours in Iraq, Papalia entered parliament after winning a by-election sparked by the resignation of scandal-tarred former minister Norm Marlborough.

Early life and naval career
Papalia was born in Bunbury, Western Australia and grew up in the nearby small town of Burekup. He served in the Royal Australian Navy for 26 years before entering politics, working as a navy diver and rising to the rank of lieutenant commander. He specialised in explosives retrieval and escape and rescue. Papalia completed Special Air Service Regiment (SASR) selection and reinforcement training in 1988. He then served in 3 SASR Squadron in 1989 and 1 SASR Squadron in 1990 before returning to the Navy in 1991. In 1992 he served with the United Nations Special Commission on Iraq to work as explosives disposal specialist, and was awarded the Conspicuous Service Cross in 1994 for his work there. Papalia later returned to Iraq during the Iraq War, serving as executive officer in an Australian mine-clearing team. He left the navy in 2004, and operated a small business renovating houses up until the time of his election to parliament.

Political career
In November 2006, state Minister for Small Business Norm Marlborough resigned from parliament after it was revealed that he had lied to the Corruption and Crime Commission about his dealings with disgraced former Premier of Western Australia Brian Burke, thus triggering a by-election in his electorate of Peel. Peel had been held by the Labor Party since the seat's inception and was generally considered a safe Labor seat, but concerns about an electoral backlash over Marlborough's conduct led the party to look for a candidate without a political background. Papalia thus nominated for Labor preselection in the by-election, and was easily successful – despite having only joined the party weeks before – after receiving strong support from Premier Alan Carpenter. He went on to easily win the by-election, receiving a small swing in his favour in a seat that the government had feared they might lose.

The district of Peel was abolished with effect at the 2008 state election. Papalia instead successfully contested the new seat of Warnbro, which covers much the same area. In March 2017, Paul was appointed as a Minister in the new McGowan Government, with the portfolios for Tourism, Racing and Gaming, Small Business, Defence Issues, Citizenship and Multicultural Affairs. Following the March 2021 election, he was appointed as Minister for Police, Road Safety, Defence Industry and Veterans Issues.

Papalia is one of six Labor MP's in the current state parliament that is not factionally aligned as of 2021.

References

1962 births
Living people
Australian military personnel of the Iraq War
Members of the Western Australian Legislative Assembly
Recipients of the Conspicuous Service Cross (Australia)
Royal Australian Navy officers
People from Bunbury, Western Australia
Australian Labor Party members of the Parliament of Western Australia
21st-century Australian politicians
Australian politicians of Italian descent
Australian people of Calabrian descent